is one of two main temples of the Sōtō school of Zen Buddhism, the largest single religious denomination in Japan (by number of temples in a single legal entity). In English, its name means "temple of eternal peace" (in Japanese, 'ei' means "eternal", 'hei' means "peaceful", and 'ji' means "Buddhist temple").

Its founder was Eihei Dōgen who brought Sōtō Zen from China to Japan during the 13th century. The ashes of Dōgen and a memorial to him are in the Jōyōden (the Founder's Hall) at Eihei-ji. William Bodiford of UCLA writes that, "The rural monastery Eiheiji in particular aggrandized Dōgen to bolster its own authority vis-à-vis its institutional rivals within the Sōtō denomination."

Eihei-ji is a training monastery with more than two hundred monks and nuns in residence. As of 2003, Eihei-ji had 800,000 visitors per year, less than half the number of tourists who came ten years before. Visitors with Zen experience may participate after making prior arrangements and all visitors are treated as religious trainees.

In keeping with Zen's Mahayana tradition, the iconography in various buildings is an array of potential confusion for newcomers: at the Sanmon are four kings standing guard named Shitenno; the Buddha hall's main altar has three statues of Buddhas past, present and future; the Hatto displays Kannon the bodhisattva of compassion, and four white lions (called the a-un no shishi); the Yokushitsu has Baddabara; the Sanshokaku has a statue of Hotei; and the Tosu displays Ucchusma.

History 

Dōgen founded Eihei-ji in 1244 with the name Sanshoho Daibutsuji in the woods of rural Japan, quite far from the distractions of Kamakura period urban life. He appointed a successor, but sometime after his death the abbacy of Eihei-ji became hotly disputed, a schism now called the sandai sōron. Until 1468, Eihei-ji was not held by the current Keizan line of Sōtō, but by the line of Dōgen's Chinese disciple Jakuen. After 1468, when the Keizan line took ownership of Eihei-ji in addition to its major temple Sōji-ji and others, Jakuen's line and other alternate lines became less prominent.

As Eihei-ji and Sōji-ji became rivals over the centuries, Eihei-ji made claims based on the fact of Dōgen's original residence there. William Bodiford of UCLA wrote:

The entire temple was destroyed by fire several times. During the late 16th century, disciples of Ikkō-shū attacked and burned the temple and surrounding buildings. Its oldest standing structure dates from 1794.

Physical layout

The Butsuden (Buddha hall) main altar carries statues of the Buddhas of the Three Times: right to left, Amida Butsu (past), Shakyamuni Butsu (present), and Miroku Bosatsu (future).

Among the temple's 70 structures are the Sanmon (gate), Hatto (lecture hall), Sōdo (Priest's or meditation hall), Daiku-in (kitchen, three stories and a basement), Yokushitsu (bath) and Tosu (toilet, Dōgen's Shōbōgenzō includes a chapter on manners appropriate for the toilet. Most of his rules are still followed today). The Shōrō (belfry) holds the obon sho, the great brahman bell. The Shidoden (Memorial Hall) contains thousands of tablets for deceased laypersons. The Joyoden (Founders hall) contains the ashes of Dōgen and his successors. Here, images of the deceased are served food daily like they are living teachers. The Kichijokaku (visitor's center) is a large four-story modern building for lay persons, with kitchen, bath, sleeping rooms and a hall for zazen.

The bronze temple bell dates to 1327 and is an Important Cultural Property. The Sanmon and Central Gate date from the 1794 rebuilding and are Prefectural Cultural Properties. A number of important manuscripts belong to the temple, including the National Treasure Universally Recommended Instructions for Zazen, by temple founder Dōgen (1233); teachings he brought back from Song China (1227); and a record of a subsidy for the earlier Sanmon in the hand of Emperor Go-En'yū (1372).

It is surrounded by bright green moss-covered boulders, and Japanese maples that turn red and gold during autumn.

Training

Today, Eihei-ji is the main training temple of Sōtō Zen. The standard training for a priest in Eihei-ji is from three months to a two-year period of practice. It is in communion with all Japanese Soto Zen temples, and some temples in America, including the San Francisco Zen Center.

Fukuyama Taiho Zenji is the head priest or abbot, who oversees trainees at Eihei-ji, and also serves as the head priest of Sotoshu (the Sōtō school of Zen) for two years beginning late January 2012. Head priests at Eihei-ji and Sōji-ji alternate terms leading Sotoshu. Fukuyama Zenji is serving his second term (his first term was from January 2008 to January 2010).

About two hundred or two hundred fifty priests and nuns in training are in residence.

The monks start their day at 3:30 a.m., or one hour later during winter, when they do zazen and read and chant sutras. Breakfast is a bowl of rice gruel with pickles. Then they do chores: clean, weed and, if needed, shovel snow. The floors and corridors have been polished smooth by daily cleaning for hundreds of years. Then they read and chant again. Dinner at 5 p.m. is meagre and ritualized: the position of the bowl and utensils is observed. Zazen or a lecture follows before bed at 9 p.m. The trainees shave each other's heads and take a bath every five days (every time the date contains a 4 or 9).

Eihei-ji has sought, since medieval times, a source of income by soliciting monks to purchase honorary titles. Monks may progress through four hōkai (dharma ranks) with some time requirements of months or years between ranks. Zuise entails paying each temple 50,000 yen (about 605 as of April 2012) for the ceremony (and about 50 to the official photographer). A monk receives an honorary meal and a bag of souvenirs at Eihei-ji and then, within one month, repeats the ceremony at Sōji-ji. The monk is then considered an oshō (priest and teacher).

Tourism

Visitors must dress modestly and keep silent. They may attend one to three day meditation retreats for a fee. Each visitor receives a list of rules, for example photography of the priests-in-training is prohibited. More than one million visitors used to pass through the gates of Eihei-ji, but as of 2003 only 800,000 came, a period in which the train service from Fukui to nearby Eiheijiguchi Station was temporarily halted.

A memorial service, a major source of revenue for Eihei-ji, has been held every fifty years since the 16th century on the anniversary of Dōgen Zenji'''s entering nirvana. For example, in 1752 about 23,700 monks attended, which raised enough money to rebuild the main gate. Groups from all over the world including a group from San Francisco formed to make a pilgrimage to Eihei-ji for the 750th anniversary in 2002.

In 1905, Eihei-ji held its first conference called Genzō e on Dōgen Zenji's Shōbōgenzō. It succeeded in attracting so many interested parties that it became an annual event. Monks and laypersons, along with academic and popular writers can attend workshops each year.

Five generations of the Asakura daimyō clan lived there until 1573, when the town was razed by Oda Nobunaga loyalists.

Denuclearization
Following the 2011 Tōhoku earthquake and tsunami, according to Religious Dispatches magazine, Eihei-ji  "mobilized clergy to accompany members of its volunteer organization Shanti International Association who will travel to northeastern Japan to aid in relief efforts".

Then in November 2011, priests at Eihei-ji held a symposium for 300 people called Cherish Our Lives: The Way of Living that We don't Choose Nuclear Power Generation on the subject of denuclearization. Two reactors in Fukui Prefecture were given the names of bodhisattvas: Monju Nuclear Power Plant and Fugen Nuclear Power Plant. The chairman of the Power Reactor and Nuclear Fuel Development Corporation had apparently misunderstood upon visiting the temple. When he told the abbot the proposed names, the Zenji'' had replied, "That's nice."  After the symposium, a priest explained, "We have realized that the nuclear power generation goes against life on the earth."

Gallery

Branches 
Japan
 Chōkoku-ji (長谷寺), also known as the Eihei-ji Tokyo Betsuin (永平寺東京別院), in Tokyo.
 Chuō-ji (中央寺), also known as the Eihei-ji Sapporo Betsuin (永平寺札幌別院), in Sapporo.
 Taianden-gokoku-in (泰安殿護国院), also known as the Eihei-ji Nagoya Betsuin　(永平寺名古屋別院), in Nagoya.
 Shōryū-ji (紹隆寺), also known as the Eihei-ji Kagoshima Shutchōjo　(永平寺鹿児島出張所), in Kagoshima.
U.S.A
 Zenshuji Soto Mission

See also 
 List of National Treasures of Japan (writings)
 Japanese Buddhist architecture
 For an explanation of terms concerning Japanese Buddhism, Japanese Buddhist art, and Japanese Buddhist temple architecture, see the Glossary of Japanese Buddhism.

Notes

External links

 Film 'Life of Zen', depicting life at Eihei-ji and Soji-ji
 Text describing life at Eijei-ji

Religious organizations established in the 1240s
Soto temples
Buddhist temples in Fukui Prefecture
1240s establishments in Japan
1244 establishments in Asia
Eiheiji, Fukui
Echizen Province
Dōgen